Nejc Gazvoda (born 5 June 1985) is a Slovene writer, screenwriter and director. He has published a number of novels and collections of short stories and also has written the scripts for two successful TV dramas and has recently written and directed his first feature film Izlet (A Trip) (2011).

Gazvoda was born in Novo Mesto in southeastern Slovenia in 1985. He studied at the Academy for Theatre, Radio, Film and Television in Ljubljana. Whilst still in secondary school he published his book of short stories Vevericam nič ne uide (Nothing Escapes the Squirrels) for which he won the Fabula Award in 2006 for best collection of short prose in Slovene published within the previous two years.

His 2011 film A Trip was selected as the Slovenian entry for the Best Foreign Language Oscar at the 85th Academy Awards, but it did not make the final shortlist.

Published works
 Vevericam nič ne uide (Nothing Escapes the Squirrels), short stories, (2004)
 Camera obscura, novel, (2004) 
 Sanjajo tisti, ki preveč spijo, novel, (2007)
 Fasunga, short stories, (2007)
 V petek so sporočili, da bo v nedeljo konec sveta (On Friday We Were Told the World Would End on Sunday), short stories, (2009), short stories, (2009)

Filmography
 Kot ptič, short documentary (2006) – writer and director
 Bordo rdeča, short film (2007) – writer and director
 Skrbnik, short film (2008) – writer and director
 Osebna prtljaga, feature film (2009) – co-writer
 Smehljaji, short film (2010) – writer
 Izlet (A Trip), feature film (2011) – writer and director
 Dvojina (Dual), feature film (2013) - writer and director
 Class Enemy (2013) – writer

References

External links
 
 Gazvoda's blog
 Vevericam nič ne uide on Goga publishing house site
 Dvojina (Dual) Facebook page - https://www.facebook.com/dvojina.dual?fref=ts
 Izlet (A Trip) Facebook page - https://www.facebook.com/IzletAtrip?fref=ts

Writers from Novo Mesto
Slovenian film directors
Living people
1985 births
Fabula laureates
Slovenian male short story writers
Slovenian short story writers
University of Ljubljana alumni